James Dillard Crocker (January 19, 1925 – September 1, 2014) was an American professional basketball player. He played at the power forward position.

Born in Coffee County, Tennessee in 1925, Crocker played one season in the Basketball Association of America (BAA) and three seasons in the National Basketball Association (NBA). During that time, Crocker played for the Fort Wayne Pistons (1948–49), the Denver Nuggets (1949–50), the Indianapolis Olympians (1951), and the Milwaukee Hawks (1951–53). He spent the 1950–51 season in the National Professional Basketball League (NPBL). He attended Western Michigan University.

Crocker died in Niles, Michigan on September 1, 2014.

BAA/NBA career statistics

Regular season

References

External links
 

1925 births
2014 deaths
American men's basketball players
Anderson Packers players
Basketball players from Michigan
Basketball players from Tennessee
Denver Nuggets (1948–1950) players
Detroit Vagabond Kings players
Fort Wayne Pistons players
Forwards (basketball)
Guards (basketball)
Indianapolis Olympians players
Milwaukee Hawks players
People from Coffee County, Tennessee
People from Niles, Michigan
Western Michigan Broncos men's basketball players